Ante Bruno Bušić (6 October 1939 – 16 October 1978) was a Croatian writer and critic of the government of Socialist Federal Republic of Yugoslavia. He was one of the best-known victims of UDBA (Yugoslav secret police) killings.

Biography 

Bušić was born in the village of Vinjani Donji near Imotski. By the time he enrolled into high school in Imotski, he was already involved in activities which communist authorities considered rebellious. In 1957, he joined a group called Tiho (silently, lit. - quietly) whose aim was to "fight for freedom, equality and the formation of a free Croatia based on democratic principles". It was at that time that the UDBA (Yugoslav secret police) began watching him. Bušić, along with his schoolmates who had also participated in Tiho, was expelled from school soon after.

Two years later, the expelled students were allowed to return to school. Bušić went on to enroll in the University of Zagreb and earned a degree in economics in 1964. The following year, he got a job at the Institute for the History of Croatia's Workers' Movement, which was run by former Yugoslav general and future Croatian president Franjo Tuđman. In 1966, he was sentenced to prison for his political views, but he had escaped to Austria during the trial. At the behest of Tuđman, who still had great influence in Yugoslavia, Bušić returned to Zagreb and was not sent to prison. In 1967, he resumed work at the Institute.

In 1969, Bušić moved on to write for the Hrvatski književni list (Croatian Literary Paper). There he confronted several issues considered controversial by Yugoslav officials. The paper was eventually banned. This led Bušić to emigrate to Paris for a period of time during which he attended the Sorbonne. Upon his return in 1971, he became one of directors of the Hrvatski tjednik (Croatian Weekly). That same year the Yugoslav government issued a crackdown on what had been called the Croatian Spring (Hrvatsko proljeće). Bušić was among those arrested and spent time in prison until 1973.

He left Yugoslavia for the last time in 1975. He spent most of the time afterwards living in England, but travelled extensively through the rest of Europe. He wrote for Nova Hrvatska (New Croatia) during this period.

He was killed in Paris, France, in 1978 by an agent of UDBA, the Yugoslav secret police.

Exactly 21 years after his death, with Croatia having gained independence, his remains were moved from Paris to the Mirogoj cemetery in Zagreb and laid to rest next to the dead of the Croatian War of Independence.

Vinko Sindičić, a former UDBA agent, was prosecuted for the murder of Bušić. He was found not guilty in 2000. On 6 June 2005, Supreme Court of Croatia upheld the verdict.

Honours
 Order of Duke Domagoj 1995 (posthumously)
Order of Stjepan Radić 1995 (posthumously)

References

External links
 Who killed Bruno Bušić?, OCTOBER 17, 2012 / 20COMMITTEE

1939 births
1978 deaths
Assassinated Croatian journalists
Croatian people murdered abroad
People murdered in Paris
People from Imotski
Faculty of Economics and Business, University of Zagreb alumni
University of Paris alumni
Croatian dissidents
Burials at Mirogoj Cemetery
Order of Ante Starčević recipients
Yugoslav dissidents
Extrajudicial killings
Assassinated Yugoslav people
20th-century journalists
Yugoslav expatriates in France
1978 murders in France
1970s murders in Paris